Moran Samuel (April 24, 1982) is an Israeli paralympic basketball player and world champion rower.
She was chosen to light a ceremonial torch on Israel's Independence Day in 2019. She represented Israel at the 2020 Summer Paralympics.

Early life
Samuel grew up in Karmiel, Israel, to a Jewish family. She began playing basketball in her hometown. During her military service in the Israeli Air Force, she was an outstanding athlete enrolled in a program that permits top athletes to complete their mandatory service while representing the country in sports as well; after her service, she played on the Israel women's national basketball team. In 2006, she suffered a spinal stroke and became paralyzed in her lower body. After she recovered, she completed her academic studies at Haifa University and became a physical therapist, and then worked with the Paralympic Sports Association team on the re-establishment of the Israeli women's basketball team on wheelchairs.

Sports career

Basketball

Playing with the national women's basketball team, she qualified for the European Wheelchair Basketball Championship, held in Nazareth in 2011, and simultaneously joined the Beit HaLohem team in Tel Aviv, with Samuel being the sole woman in an all-male team. Beit LaLohem won the double championship in 2011. In 2013, she played for Israel at the European Wheelchair Basketball Championship in Frankfurt, with the team finishing in the seventh place overall. At this competition, she was voted one of the five best players in Europe titled "All Star Team".

Rowing
She switched to Para rowing because she wanted to represent Israel at the Paralympic Games.

As part of her paralympic sport activities, and as suggested by her life partner, also a rower, she started to train in rowing in 2010 and represented Israel at the 2012 Summer Paralympic Games in London, finishing fifth. Earlier that year, she won a race in single scull competition at the Adaptive Rowing Regatte in Gavirate, Italy, but the organizers did not have a copy of the Hatikva, Israel's national anthem; she asked for the microphone and sang it instead. In 2015, she won the gold medal at the World Cup event in Lake Varese, defeating the reigning world champion, Norwegian rower Birgit Skarstein.

At the 2015 World Rowing Championships held in Lac d'Aiguebelette, France, she won the gold medal in the women's AS single sculls, thus earning a spot at the 2016 Summer Paralympics in Rio de Janeiro. Also, she received the bronze medal in June 2016 at the World Rowing Cup in Poznań.

Samuel took part in the torch lighting ceremony at the 2017 Maccabiah Games in July 2017.

Samuel won the silver medal in the arms only single sculls at the 2020 Summer Paralympic Games in Tokyo.(August 29, 2021)  It was after setting her personal best record in the repechage the day before.

Personal life
She is a lesbian.  She has a son and a daughter in addition to her wife.

References

External links
 

1982 births
Israeli female rowers
Living people
Paralympic rowers of Israel
Sportspeople from Tel Aviv
Israeli women's basketball players
World Rowing Championships medalists for Israel
Lesbian sportswomen
Israeli LGBT sportspeople
Israeli lesbians
LGBT basketball players
LGBT rowers
Paralympic medalists in rowing
Paralympic silver medalists for Israel
Paralympic bronze medalists for Israel
Rowers at the 2016 Summer Paralympics
Rowers at the 2020 Summer Paralympics
Medalists at the 2016 Summer Paralympics
Medalists at the 2020 Summer Paralympics
Israeli Jews
Jewish sportspeople